Robert "Bob" Alper is an American author, stand-up comedian, and practicing clergy member.  As an ordained rabbi, Alper served congregations for fourteen years and holds a doctorate from Princeton Theological Seminary.

He has appeared at the Montreal Comedy Festival and at The Hollywood Improv. He often performs with Arab and Muslim comedy partners, primarily at colleges and universities.  He has been seen on Good Morning America, Showtime, the BBC, CNN, and was featured on Extra.

Alper is the author of three books: Thanks. I Needed That., Life Doesn't Get Any Better Than This: The Holiness of Little Daily Dramas, an inspirational collection; as well as the cartoon book, A Rabbi Confesses. He has produced two comedy CDs.

References

External links
 Official website
 Thanks. I Needed That.

American male comedians
American rabbis
Jewish American male comedians
Living people
Place of birth missing (living people)
Year of birth missing (living people)
20th-century American comedians
21st-century American comedians
21st-century American Jews